During the 1969–70 English football season, Brentford competed in the Football League Fourth Division. Despite staying in the promotion places throughout much of the campaign, three-late season defeats cost the Bees promotion to the Third Division.

Season summary 
There was the perception around Griffin Park during the 1969 off-season that after the financial austerity of the previous two-and-a-half years, the extreme cost-cutting measures enacted by former chairman Ron Blindell had reduced Brentford's target to merely staying in business, rather than challenging for promotion to the Third Division. Former director Walter Wheatley's loans to the club had taken its debts down to a manageable proportion, but after being installed as chairman (Blindell had died in January 1969), Wheatley carried on the austerity into the 1969–70 season. Manager Jimmy Sirrel once again had his hands tied in the transfer market, releasing experienced campaigners Denis Hunt, Pat Terry and Ron Foster and bringing in three attackers, two on free transfers (Bill Brown and Micky Cook) and one on trial (Roger Frude).

From the point of view of manpower, Brentford began the season in the worst possible way, with just 14 fit players. Despite the early-season transfer of the versatile John Richardson to rivals Fulham for £10,000, Brentford had an excellent start to the season, with goals from Allan Mansley, Bobby Ross and Micky Cook helping the club stabilise its position in the promotion places. The number of fit players dropped to 13 by October 1969, with the lack of a recognised centre forward being the problem. On 10 November, manager Jimmy Sirrel dropped the bombshell that he was leaving the club to take up the manager's position at Notts County. Forward Ron Fenton took over as caretaker manager and though the Bees exited the FA Cup in the first round (quickly ending any chances of a money-spinning cup run), Fenton managed to keep the club in and around the promotion places before Frank Blunstone was installed as manager just prior to Christmas 1969.

Despite an inconsistent first month under new manager Frank Blunstone, Brentford continued to keep pace with the promotion race. Blunstone was able to expand the squad slightly, with midfielders Brian Turner and Brian Tawse signing on a permanent basis and forward Alan Cocks coming in on loan to replace departed loanee Gerry Baker. Ever-present goalkeeper Chic Brodie had his best season so far at Griffin Park and kept 20 clean sheets. The Bees moved as high as 2nd position in late January and early February 1970 and manager Blunstone went for broke, finally signing a recognised centre forward (Roger Cross from West Ham United for £10,000) and bringing winger John Docherty back for a third spell with the club. Three defeats in four matches in late March and early April effectively ended the promotion charge, with the three-point gap to 4th-place Port Vale proving to be insurmountable.

Two records were set during the season, which as of  have never been bettered:
 Least Football League goals conceded in a season: 39
 Least home Football League goals conceded in a season: 11

League table

Results
Brentford's goal tally listed first.

Legend

Football League Fourth Division

FA Cup

Football League Cup 

 Sources: 100 Years Of Brentford, Statto

Playing squad 
Players' ages are as of the opening day of the 1969–70 season.

 Sources: 100 Years Of Brentford, Timeless Bees

Coaching staff

Jimmy Sirrel (10 August – 10 November 1969)

Ron Fenton (10 November – December 1969)

Frank Blunstone (December 1969 – 24 April 1970)

Statistics

Appearances and goals
Substitute appearances in brackets.

Players listed in italics left the club mid-season.
Source: 100 Years Of Brentford

Goalscorers 

Players listed in italics left the club mid-season.
Source: 100 Years Of Brentford

Management

Summary

Transfers & loans

Notes

References 

Brentford F.C. seasons
Brentford